"Here Today, Here Tomorrow" is a song recorded by Canadian country music artist George Fox. It was released in 1991 as the third single from his third studio album, Spice of Life. It peaked at number 10 on the RPM Country Tracks chart in April 1992.

Chart performance

Year-end charts

References

1991 songs
1991 singles
George Fox songs
Warner Music Group singles
Songs written by Bob DiPiero
Songs written by John Scott Sherrill
Songs written by George Fox (singer)
Song recordings produced by Garth Fundis